Sydney Football Club, an association football club based in Moore Park, Sydney, was founded in 2004. They became the first Sydney member admitted into A-League in 2005. The club's first team have competed in numerous nationally and internationally organised competitions, and all players who have played between 25 and 99 such matches, either as a member of the starting eleven or as a substitute, are listed below.

Each player's details include the duration of his Sydney FC career, his typical playing position while with the club, and the number of games played and goals scored in all senior competitive matches.

Key
 The list is ordered first by date of debut, and then if necessary in alphabetical order.
 Appearances as a substitute are included.
 Statistics are correct up to and including the match played on 14 January 2023. Where a player left the club permanently after this date, his statistics are updated to his date of leaving.

Players

Players highlighted in bold are still actively playing at Sydney FC.

References
General
 
 
 

Specific

Sydney FC
Lists of soccer players by club in Australia
Association football player non-biographical articles